La Campana is a town located in the province of Seville, Spain. It lies 56 km of Seville, the capital of the province. According to the 2020 census (INE), the town has a population of 5238 inhabitants.

References

External links
La Campana - Sistema de Información Multiterritorial de Andalucía

Municipalities of the Province of Seville